Marcus Thomas Pius Gilbert (also known as Tom Gilbert, and publishing as M Thomas P Gilbert) is an evolutionary biologist. His work is very highly cited, and influential in the fields of palaeogenomics, evolutionary genomics and evolutionary hologenomics. He is currently the Director of the University of Copenhagen's Center for Evolutionary Hologenomics

He received a  BA in Biological Sciences at Oriel College, Oxford University in 2000, and a D.Phil. (Doctor of Philosophy) from the Zoology Dept and at New College, Oxford University in 2004 under Alan Cooper. Subsequently, he was a post-doctoral fellow with Michael Worobey at the Department of Ecology and Evolutionary Biology, at the University of Arizona, where he undertook genetic analyses on samples containing some of the earliest recorded HIV-1 infected tissues. In 2005, he became an Assistant Professor at the University of Copenhagen, where he has been Professor of Palaeogenomics since 2011, initially at the Natural History Museum of Denmark, and subsequently at the GLOBE Institute. In 2020 he founded and became the first Director of the https://dg.dk/ Center for Evolutionary Hologenomics. He is also a Professor II at NTNU University Museum (Trondheim, Norway). He is currently an Associate Editor of the journals, Evolution, Medicine and Public Health, and Methods in Ecology and Evolution, and a former editor of the journals PLOS One, Environmental DNA, Open Quaternary and Archaeological and Anthropological Sciences. He is a member of the Editorial Board for Current Biology. and an elected member of the Royal Danish Academy of Sciences and Letters

Publications
As of January 2022 he was the author of ca. 390 papers in peer-reviewed journals.

References

External links 
 https://globe.ku.dk/research/evogenomics/gilbert-group/
 https://ceh.ku.dk/
 https://globe.ku.dk/

Evolutionary biologists
Living people
Alumni of Oriel College, Oxford
Alumni of New College, Oxford
1977 births
People from Hammersmith